Bruce Goodin (born 10 November 1969) is a New Zealand equestrian. He competed in show jumping at the 1992, 2000, 2004, and at the 2008 Summer Olympics in Beijing.

References

External links

1969 births
Living people
New Zealand male equestrians
Olympic equestrians of New Zealand
Equestrians at the 1992 Summer Olympics
Equestrians at the 2000 Summer Olympics
Equestrians at the 2004 Summer Olympics
Equestrians at the 2008 Summer Olympics
Equestrians at the 2020 Summer Olympics